Kothamangalam may refer to:

Kothamangalam, Kerala, a town in Ernakulam district, Kerala, India
Kothamangalam, Sivaganga, a town in Sivaganga district, Tamil Nadu, India
Kothamangalam Subbu, Tamil author, actor and film director